Volčje is a place name that may refer to:

Volčje, Bloke, a village in the Municipality of Bloke, southern Slovenia
Volčje, Brežice, a village in the Municipality of Brežice, southeastern Slovenia